Suesca is a town and municipality in the Almeidas Province, part of the department of Cundinamarca, Colombia. Suesca forms the northern edge of the Bogotá savanna and is a scenic countryside town which is well known because its landscape attracts devotees of rock climbing, trekking, and rafting. It is surrounded by dairy farms and flower plantations. The municipality borders Cucunubá and Lenguazaque in the north, Sesquilé and Gachancipá in the south, Chocontá in the east and Nemocón in the west.

Etymology 
The name Suesca is derived from the Chibcha word Suejica, Sueica or Suesuca, which means "Rock of the birds" or "Tail of the macaw".

History 
Suesca was inhabited early in the history of inhabitation of the Altiplano and the rock shelters formed the site for semi-nomadic hunter-gatherers of the Herrera and preceramic periods.

Before the Spanish conquest, Suesca was part of the Muisca Confederation. The cacique of Guatavita ruled over Suesca, the village close to the sacred Lake Guatavita and containing Lake Suesca where rituals were held. Suesca formed an important centre on the trade road to Boyacá, ruled by the hoa of Hunza. The merchants took coal and salt on their way to the north. Every four days a market was held in Suesca. Suesca was also an important settlement for the pottery made by the Muisca.

When conquistador Gonzalo Jiménez de Quesada arrived in Suesca in March 1537, he founded the modern town. In Suesca he sentenced a soldier of his army to death for stealing mantles from the Muisca. After submitting the hoa of Hunza, Eucaneme, the Muisca ruler was taken prisoner to Suesca in an attempt to get him to reveal the location of his treasures. When the psihipqua of Muyquytá, Bogotá, heard about the Spanish presence in Suesca, he sent a spy to the town to gain information about their strength. The Muisca, unfamiliar with horses and horseback riders, thought that the horse and the rider were one. When a horse died in Suesca, they found out this was not the case. 

In 1602, in a cave in Suesca, 150 Muisca mummies were discovered. The mummies were organised in a circle around the mummy of the cacique of the town. Rock art has also been found in Suesca. The pictographs of Suesca are among the most extensive of Cundinamarca, but at the same time the most vandalised.

Tourism 
 Handicrafts - Wool clothes
 Church of Nuestra Señora del Rosario
It is found  from Suesca town.
 Suesca Monoliths - wind erosion of the sandstone has produced natural monoliths
A beautiful landscape, the rocks are ideal for people who love trekking and climbing, with many guided tours taking place at the cliffs. The rocks of Suesca are considered the birthplace of Colombian rock climbing, and feature over 400 routes on excellent quality sandstone up to several pitches in length, with a majority of routes being one pitch. The area is best known for traditional climbing, but there are many sport (bolted) routes as well. The Bogotá River flows along the Rocas de Suesca. To get to the cliffs, one walks from the town along the train tracks for about 10 minutes. The train only runs very early in the morning, so there is little danger. Camping is available very close to cliffs or there is reasonably priced lodging close to Rocas de Suesca.
 Getting to Suesca: by car or bus:
 By car from Bogotá, one should take Autopista Norte that goes to Tunja, passing a toll bridge in Autopista Norte; then one will pass Briceño, the town of Tocancipá and a second toll bridge; then you will find yourself on the main road to Tunja, where you will reach a crossroads: right leads to Sesquilé and left to Suesca.
 Rocas de Suesca - natural cliffs approximately ☃☃ long that are located ☃☃ before arriving to Suesca town. A beautiful landscape, the rocks are ideal for people who love trekking and climbing, with many guided tours taking place at the cliffs. The rocks of Suesca are considered the birthplace of Colombian rock climbing, and feature over 400 routes☃☃ on excellent quality sandstone up to several pitches in length, with a majority of routes being one pitch. The area is best known for traditional climbing, but there are many sport (bolted) routes as well. The Bogotá River flows along the Rocas de Suesca.

Gallery

See also 

 Gonzalo Jiménez de Quesada
 Railway stations in Colombia
 San Gil

References

Bibliography

External links 

 Climbing in Suesca
  Rocas de Suesca - Colparques

Tourist attractions in Cundinamarca Department
Municipalities of Cundinamarca Department
Populated places established in 1537
1537 establishments in the Spanish Empire
1537 disestablishments in the Muisca Confederation
Muysccubun
Climbing areas of Colombia